Serro Ventoso is a civil parish in the municipality of Porto de Mós, Portugal. The population in 2021 was 892, in an area of 34.16 km2. It was created in 1933.

References 

Parishes of Porto de Mós